Robert Greig Davidson (21 July 1875 – 3 August 1948) was a Liberal party member of the House of Commons of Canada. He was born in Sherbrooke, Quebec and became a farmer.

Davidson attended high school in Sherbrooke and then St. Charles Borromeo College in Charlesbourg. He became a trustee of Stanstead Wesleyan College and director of the Western Townships Agricultural Association.

He was first elected to Parliament at the Stanstead riding in the 1935 general election. He was re-elected for a second term in 1940, but this was declared void in May 1943. Davidson lost the resulting by-election on 9 August 1943 to Joseph-Armand Choquette.

Electoral record

References

External links
 

1875 births
1948 deaths
Canadian farmers
Liberal Party of Canada MPs
Members of the House of Commons of Canada from Quebec
Politicians from Sherbrooke